Tobias Wagner (born 26 March 1995) is an Austrian handball player for Fenix Toulouse and the Austrian national team.

He participated at the 2018 European Men's Handball Championship.

References

1995 births
Living people
Handball players from Vienna
Austrian male handball players
Expatriate handball players
Austrian expatriate sportspeople in Germany
Austrian expatriate sportspeople in France
Handball-Bundesliga players